Louis Ridout is an English international indoor and outdoor bowls player.

Bowls career
In 2015 he won the pairs bronze medal at the Atlantic Bowls Championships.

In 2016 he won the National title in the Pairs with Sam Tolchard. The bowler who represents Devon represented England during the 2016 World Outdoor Bowls Championship.

He was selected as part of the English team for the 2018 Commonwealth Games on the Gold Coast in Queensland where he claimed a bronze medal in the Fours with David Bolt, Jamie Chestney and Sam Tolchard.

He was crowned National singles champion in August 2018 after defeating Andrew Squire 21–16 in the final. He subsequently became the British singles champion after winning the British Isles Bowls Championships the following year. He bowls for Kings BC, who have won the Top Club championship four years running from 2016–2019.

In 2022, he competed in the men's triples and the men's fours at the 2022 Commonwealth Games. The team of Ridout, Nick Brett and Jamie Chestney won the triples gold medal and in the fours he also secured a bronze medal.

References

English male bowls players
1990 births
Living people
Commonwealth Games gold medallists for England
Commonwealth Games bronze medallists for England
Commonwealth Games medallists in lawn bowls
Bowls players at the 2018 Commonwealth Games
Bowls players at the 2022 Commonwealth Games
Medallists at the 2018 Commonwealth Games
Medallists at the 2022 Commonwealth Games